Ha Ji-won (born 28 June 1978) is a South Korean actress. She is best known for the historical dramas Damo (2003), Hwang Jini (2006), Empress Ki (2013), as well as the melodrama Something Happened in Bali (2004) and romantic comedy series Secret Garden (2010).

Film

Television series

Web series

Hosting and variety show

Narrator

Music video appearances

References

External links
 
 Filmography on HanCinema

South Korean filmographies